The Hamilton Correctional Institution is a state prison for men located in Jasper, Hamilton County, Florida, owned and operated by the Florida Department of Corrections.   This facility has a mix of security levels, including minimum, medium, and close, and houses adult male offenders.  Hamilton first opened in 1987 and has a maximum capacity of 1177 prisoners. 

The adjacent Hamilton Annex opened in 1995 with a maximum capacity of 1408 inmates.

References

Prisons in Florida
Buildings and structures in Hamilton County, Florida
1987 establishments in Florida